The Man Who Lost is a 1910 American silent film produced by Kalem Company and directed by Sidney Olcott with Thomas Santley, Gene Gauntier, George Melford in the leading roles.

Cast
 Thomas Santley
 Gene Gauntier 
 George Melford
 Jane Wolfe

Production notes
The film was shot in Jacksonville, Florida.

Bibliography
 The Billboard, 1910, January 29, p 32
 The Film Index, 1910, January 22, p 21; January 29, p 13
 The Moving Picture World, Vol 6, p 139, p 143, p 215
 The New York Dramatic Mirror, 1910, February 5, p 17
 Variety, 1910, February 5, p 125

External links
 AFI Catalog

 The Man Who Lost website dedicated to Sidney Olcott

1910 films
1910 drama films
1910 short films
American black-and-white films
American silent short films
Films directed by Sidney Olcott
Films set in Florida
Films shot in Jacksonville, Florida
Silent American drama films
1910s American films